Maria Niggemeyer (May 18, 1888 – September 27, 1968) was a German politician of the Christian Democratic Union (CDU) and former member of the German Bundestag.

Life 
Niggemeyer was a member of the Economic Council of Bizone in 1948/49. She was a member of the German Bundestag from its first election in 1949 to 1961. From 1949 to 1957 she represented the constituency Paderborn - Wiedenbrück and in 1957 she entered parliament via the state list of the CDU North Rhine-Westphalia. From 13 February 1953 to 1957, she was chairman of the Bundestag committee for public welfare issues.

Literature

References

1888 births
1968 deaths
Members of the Bundestag for North Rhine-Westphalia
Members of the Bundestag 1957–1961
Members of the Bundestag 1953–1957
Members of the Bundestag 1949–1953
Female members of the Bundestag
20th-century German women politicians
Members of the Bundestag for the Christian Democratic Union of Germany